Speaking in Tongues is the fifth solo studio album by American rapper Bizzy Bone. It was released on September 27, 2005 via 845 Entertainment/SMC Recordings. The title is in reference to the incident in which Bizzy Bone went on a spiritual rant during an interview on Houston radio station KPFT FM, speaking in tongues.

Production was handled by Eddie B, Quite Stankable Productions, Tightanniam Beats and Studio KRat, with Greg Miller and Jarred Weisfeld serving as executive producer. It features guest appearances from Bambino and Kahnma. The album peaked at number 83 on the Billboard 200, number 59 on the Top R&B/Hip-Hop Albums and number 15 on the Independent Albums in the United States.

Track listing

Charts

References

External links

2005 albums
Bizzy Bone albums
SMC Recordings albums